Stictoleptura tripartita is a species of beetle in the family Cerambycidae found in Iran, Syria and Turkey.

Description
The species is red-black coloured. They live 2–3 years, and fly from June–August.

References

Stictoleptura
Beetles described in 1889
Beetles of Asia